A national Antarctic program is any government operated or supported program which is mandated with managing the support of scientific research and contributing to the governance and protection of the Antarctic environment on behalf of its nation and in the spirit of the Antarctic Treaty.  The Antarctic Treaty, the international agreement that regulates Antarctic activity, has been signed by 54 countries. Of those, 38 have national Antarctic programs. 31 of these programs have a permanent presence in Antarctica and are members of Council of Managers of National Antarctic Programs (COMNAP). Six countries have no permanent presence in Antarctica, but have programs that are observers to COMNAP. Only one country, Pakistan, maintains a national Antarctic program with no affiliation to COMNAP.

List of programs

References 

 
 
Antarctica-related lists
Government research
Science and technology in Antarctica
Antarctic research
Research-related lists